Yomou is a prefecture located in the Nzérékoré Region of Guinea. The capital and principal town of the prefecture is Yomou. The prefecture covers an area of 3,920 km.² and has an estimated population of 114,371.

As of 2005, Yomou town is estimated to have a population of around 12,000. The town is an important trading centre for the Guinea Highlands area.

Sub-prefectures
The prefecture is divided administratively into 7 sub-prefectures:
 Yomou-Centre
 Banié
 Bheeta
 Bignamou
 Bowé
 Djécké
 Péla

Prefectures of Guinea
Nzérékoré Region